Manikkodi was a Tamil non-fiction literary weekly that was published from 1933 to 1939. Founded by Stalin Srinivasan, V. Ramaswami Iyengar and T. S. Chockalingam, the magazine was noted for its expertly-written articles by eminent authors like Swaminatha Athreya and gave birth to the Manikkodi Literary Movement. The magazine launched the careers of newcomers like C. S. Chellappa, Puthumaipithan, and Chitti who have earned acclaim as literary greats.

References

 

1933 establishments in India
1939 disestablishments in India
Defunct literary magazines
Defunct magazines published in India
Literary magazines published in India
Weekly magazines published in India
Magazines established in 1933
Magazines disestablished in 1939
Tamil-language magazines
Mass media in Chennai